Martín Rodríguez (born 18 December 1969) is a former professional tennis player from Argentina. Rodríguez turned professional in 1991. He reached his career-high singles ranking when he became World Number 71 on June 14, 1999. On 25 October 2004, he reached his career-high doubles rank, when he became World Number 15.

Rodríguez's coach was Horacio de la Peña. He currently resides in Buenos Aires.

After testing positive for an excessive amount of caffeine, Rodríguez forfeited prize money and ranking points from the 2002 ATP tournament in Basel.

ATP career finals

Doubles: 14 (6 titles, 8 runner-ups)

ATP Challenger and ITF Futures finals

Singles: 9 (1–8)

Doubles: 17 (11–6)

Performance timelines

Singles

Doubles

References

External links
 
 
 

1969 births
Living people
Argentine male tennis players
Olympic tennis players of Argentina
Sportspeople from Córdoba, Argentina
Tennis players from Buenos Aires
Tennis players at the 2004 Summer Olympics
Doping cases in tennis
21st-century Argentine people